Kim Clijsters defeated Caroline Wozniacki in the final, 6–3, 5–7, 6–3 to win the singles tennis title at the 2010 WTA Tour Championships. It was her third and last Tour Finals singles title.

Serena Williams was the defending champion but did not participate due to injury.

Francesca Schiavone and Samantha Stosur made their debuts in the event.

Players

Notes:
  Venus Williams had qualified but withdrew due to left knee injury
  Serena Williams had qualified but withdrew out due to foot injury

Alternates

Draw

Finals

Maroon group
Standings are determined by: 1. number of wins; 2. number of matches; 3. in two-players-ties, head-to-head records; 4. in three-players-ties, percentage of sets won, or of games won; 5. steering-committee decision.

White group
Standings are determined by: 1. number of wins; 2. number of matches; 3. in two-players-ties, head-to-head records; 4. in three-players-ties, percentage of sets won, or of games won; 5. steering-committee decision.

See also
WTA Tour Championships appearances

References
 Draw

Wta Tour Championships - Singles
Singles 2010